Khair Assembly constituency is one of the 403 constituencies of the Uttar Pradesh Legislative Assembly, India. It is a part of the Aligarh district and one of the five assembly constituencies in the Aligarh Lok Sabha constituency. First election in this assembly constituency was held in 1951 after the "DPACO (1951)" (delimitation order) was passed in 1951. After the "Delimitation of Parliamentary and Assembly Constituencies Order" was passed in 2008, the constituency was assigned identification number 71.

Members of Legislative Assembly

1962: Chetanya Raj Singh, Swatantra Party
1967: Piarey Lal, Indian National Congress
1969: Mahendra Singh, Bharatiya Kranti Dal
1974: Piarey Lal, Indian National Congress
1977: Piarey Lal, Janata Party
1980: Shivrajj Singh, Indian National Congress (Indira)
1985: Jag Vir, Lok Dal
1989: Jagvir Singh, Janata Dal
1991: Chd. Mahendra Singh, Bhartiya Janta Party
1993: Jagveer Singh, Janata Dal
1996: Gyan Wati, Bhartiya Janta Party
2002: Pramod Gaur, Bahujan Samaj Party
2007: Satpal Singh, Rashtriya Lok Dal
2012: Bhagwati Prasad, Rashtriya Lok Dal
2017: Anoop Pradhan, Bhartiya Janta Party
2022: Anoop Pradhan, Bhartiya Janta Party

Election results

2022

2012

References

External links
 

Assembly constituencies of Uttar Pradesh
Politics of Aligarh district